The following is a list of Teen Choice Award winners and nominees for Choice TV - Breakout Show. It was first introduced in 2000.

Winners and nominees

2000s

2010s

References

Breakout TV Show